Norwich University – The Military College of Vermont is a private senior military college in Northfield, Vermont. It is the oldest private and senior military college in the United States and offers bachelor's and master's degrees on-campus and online. The university was founded in 1819 in Norwich, Vermont, as the American Literary, Scientific and Military Academy. It is the oldest of six senior military colleges and is recognized by the United States Department of Defense as the "Birthplace of ROTC" (Reserve Officers' Training Corps).

History

Partridge & His Military Academy
The university was founded in 1819 in Norwich, Vermont by Captain Alden Partridge, military educator and former superintendent of West Point. Partridge believed in the "American System of Education," a traditional liberal arts curriculum with instruction in civil engineering  and military science. After leaving West Point because of congressional disapproval of his system, he returned to his native state of Vermont to create the American Literary, Scientific and Military Academy. Partridge, in founding the academy, rebelled against the reforms of Sylvanus Thayer to prevent the rise of what he saw as the greatest threat to the security of the young republic: an aristocratic and careerist officer class. 

He believed that a well-trained militia was an urgent necessity and developed the American system around that idea. His academy inspired a number of military colleges throughout the nation, including The Citadel. It also was a model for the land grant colleges created through the Morrill Act of 1862. Today, Norwich offers substantial online distance graduate programs. It is similar in many regards to The Citadel in mission, online offerings, student body composition, and size.

All entering freshmen aspiring to the Corps of Cadets are called "Rooks", and their first year at Norwich is called "Rookdom". The institution of "Rookdom" consists of two three-month processes that mold civilians into Norwich Cadets: Rook Basic Training and Basic Leadership Training. Culmination of Rook Basic Training marks the halfway point toward Recognition and occurs before Thanksgiving break, after which Rooks are awarded privileges. Recognition for acceptance into the Corps of Cadets typically occurs around the eighteenth week.

Partridge's educational beliefs were considered radical at the time. His views conflicted with Army officials in the federal government while he was the superintendent of West Point. When he established his own academy, he immediately incorporated classes of agriculture and modern languages in addition to the sciences, liberal arts, and various military subjects. Field exercises, for which Partridge borrowed cannon and muskets from the federal and state governments, supplemented classroom instruction. They also required students to practice with authentic weapons to support the college’s program of well-rounded military education.

Partridge founded 16 other military institutions during his quest to reform the fledgling United States military, including the Virginia Literary, Scientific and Military Academy at Portsmouth, Virginia (1839–1846); Pennsylvania Literary, Scientific, and Military Academy at Bristol, Pennsylvania (1842–1845); Pennsylvania Military Institute at Harrisburg, Pennsylvania (1845–1848); Wilmington Literary, Scientific and Military Academy at Wilmington, Delaware (1846–1848); the Scientific and Military Collegiate Institute at Reading, Pennsylvania (1850–1854); Gymnasium and Military Institute at Pembroke, New Hampshire (1850–1853); and the National Scientific and Military Academy at Brandywine Springs, Delaware (1853).

Fire and Hardship: The 19th Century
In 1825 the academy moved to Middletown, Connecticut, in an attempt by Captain Partridge to earn the forthcoming U.S. Naval Academy contract. Beginning in 1826, the academy offered the first program of courses in civil engineering in the US. 

In 1829, the state of Connecticut declined to grant Captain Partridge a charter, and he moved the school back to Norwich. (The Middletown campus was adapted in as Wesleyan College). In 1834, Vermont granted a charter to Partridge and recognized his institution as Norwich University. 

During the 1856 academic year, the first chapter of the Theta Chi Fraternity was founded by cadets Frederick Norton Freeman and Arthur Chase. With the beginning of the Civil War in 1861, Norwich cadets served as instructors of state militias throughout the Northeast. The entire class of 1862 enlisted in the United States military upon its graduation. 

Norwich turned out hundreds of officers and soldiers who served with the federal armies in the American Civil War, including four recipients of the Medal of Honor. One graduate led a corps, seven more headed divisions, 21 commanded brigades, 38 led regiments, and various alumni served in 131 different regimental organizations. In addition, these men were eyewitnesses to some of the war's most dramatic events, including the bloodiest day of the conflict at Antietam, the attack up Marye's Heights at Fredericksburg, and the repulse of Pickett's Charge at Gettysburg. Seven hundred and fifty Norwich men served in the Civil War, of whom an estimated fifty-six fought for the Confederacy. Because of the university's high rate of participation in the war, the number of students dwindled: only seven were in the Class of 1864.

The Confederate raid on St. Albans, Vermont precipitated fear that Newport, Vermont was an imminent target. The Corps of Cadets quickly boarded an express train for Newport the same day, October 19, 1864, and were greeted with great relief by residents when they arrived.

After a catastrophic fire in 1866, which devastated the Old South Barracks and the entire Military Academy, the town of Northfield welcomed the struggling school. The Civil War, the fire, and  uncertainty whether the university would continue adversely affected continuing students and new admissions. The school opened in fall 1866 with only 19 students. During the 1870s and 1880s the institution struggled financially, affected by national economic crises. It was renamed as Lewis College in 1880. In 1881, the student body consisted of only a dozen men. 

By 1884, the Vermont Legislature changed the name of the school back to Norwich. In the 1890s, the United States Army and Norwich expanded their collaboration. Career officer Jesse McI. Carter received a two-year appointment as an instructor and Commandant of Cadets. In 1898 the university was designated by the legislature as the Military College of the State of Vermont.

War and Expansion: The 20th Century
As part of the Vermont National Guard, the school's Corps of Cadets was mobilized as a squadron of cavalry in the First Vermont Regiment to assist in General John J. Pershing's Mexican Expedition on the southern border. This greatly disrupted the academic year. In 1916, after the outbreak of war in Europe, the War Department designated Norwich as the first site for a Senior ROTC cavalry unit. Also that year, Harold "Doc" Martin (NU 1920), matriculate: the first African American to attend the university. 

Classes graduated early for both the First and Second World Wars. Many Norwich-made officers participated, serving in all theaters of both conflicts. Professional education offered at Norwich changed and adapted with the advance of technology. Military flight training began in 1939. From 1946 to 1947, horse cavalry was completely phased out in favor of armored cavalry.

Graduates returning from European and Pacific fields of battle after World War II found a university very different from the one they had left. From the late 1940s to the 1960s, Norwich was greatly expanded and added a number of new opportunities. In 1947, the Army Department created a new program uniquely suited to Vermont's harsh climate: a mountain and cold weather warfare unit. Air Force and Navy ROTC programs were established in 1972 and 1984, respectively. During the 1974 school year, the university admitted women into the Corps of Cadets, two years before the federal service academies did. The 1972 merger and 1993 integration with Vermont College added two groups to "the Hill," women and civilian students.

Hazing
In the nineteenth century, hazing of undergraduates by upperclassmen was normal in all military schools and many non-military ones as well. Hazing diminished in the early 20th century. By the late 20th century, it was prohibited by university rules and illegal by state law. But, there were several reported instances of hazing in 1990, 1995, and 2022.

Preparing Leaders for 21st Century
In 2001, Norwich sold its Vermont College campus and non-traditional degree programs to the Union Institute and University. In 2008 Vermont College's arts programs were spun off to establish the independent Vermont College of Fine Arts.

Prior to the 2009–2010 school year, companies consisted of one upperclassmen platoon and one freshmen platoon, with each platoon consisting of three squads. The companies in the original system were Alpha, Bravo, Charlie, Delta, Echo, Foxtrot, Golf, Hotel, India, Kilo, Lima, Mike, Band, Drill Team, Military Police, and Artillery. The companies Alpha through Mike were known as "line companies", and were part of Battalions 1, 2, 3 and 4. Band, Drill Team, Military Police and Artillery were placed in Provisional Battalion. 

Under this traditional system a cadet could serve in one company his entire time at the school, building strong camaraderie and connections. While this had the benefit of creating unique cultures and traditions in each company, and strengthened the bond each cadet had with his/her fellow "Rook Buddies" and the Corps and school at large, sometimes long-standing company traditions led to fraternity-like hazing and eventually challenged the authority of the Corps chain of command.

In 2009, the Provisional Artillery Company was deactivated.

Campus

Academic buildings

Ainsworth Hall
In 1910 Ainsworth Hall was constructed for the United States Weather Bureau as its central Vermont station. Returned to the university in 1948, it served as the administrative headquarters of the campus. By 1955, growth of the university forced the relocation of the administration to Dewey Hall. When construction began on Webb Hall that year to the immediate west of Ainsworth Hall, the infirmary moved into the now empty structure. As the university expanded in the 1960s and 1970s, the Hall was adapted for use by the Division of Social Sciences. The building is named for Mrs. Laura Ainsworth, widow of Captain James E. Ainsworth (NU 1853). In 1915 he had worked to bring an infirmary to campus.

Chaplin Hall
Chaplin Hall, originally Carnegie Hall, was built in 1907. The School of Architecture + Art is located there. Paid for by Andrew Carnegie, the building served as the university's library until 1993 with the construction of Kreitzberg Library. When the library was renovated in 1952, from the contributions of trustee Henry P. Chaplin, it was rededicated as the Henry Prescott Chaplin Memorial Library. Until 1941 and the addition of Partridge Hall to the growing campus, Chaplin Hall also provided the classrooms and offices for the Department of Electrical Engineering.

Communications Building
This building, on the site of the first building in Northfield Center, contains the offices and classrooms of the Communications Department. The offices for the school newspaper The Guidon and the studios for the university's radio station WNUB-FM are also located in this building. The building was purchased by the university in 1973 and restored in 1988.

Dewey Hall
Named for Admiral of the Navy George Dewey (NU 1852–1854), and completed in 1902, Dewey Hall is one of the oldest buildings in the Northfield campus. It was originally four stories high with the lower floor occupied by offices of the university's administration, the library and museum. Office space for trustees and faculty, a chapel with a seating of five hundred and the United States Weather Bureau were located on the fourth floor. With the departure of the Weather Bureau in 1909 and the completion of the then new Carnegie Library in 1907, the Hall was primarily used by the Military Department. In October 1925 a fire gutted the building which led to its reconstruction as a three-story structure.

Hollis House
Hollis House is today the location of a number of classrooms and offices of the College of Liberal Arts. Built in 1852, the building was until 1909 the house of a number of prominent residents of Northfield. When sold that year to the university, it became part of the US Weather Bureau's station collocated on campus. The building was later named for David B. "Dixie" Hollis (NU 1922) who upon his death in 1993 gave what was then the largest donation in the university's history: $7 million.

Engineering, Math and Science Complex
The Engineering, Math and Science Complex houses the David Crawford School of Engineering as well as the departments of Geology, Chemistry, Physics, Biology, Mathematics and Sports Medicine. An addition of Nursing was completed in 2011. The complex (known as the "U" building) is composed of six sections: Juckett, Partridge and Tompkins Halls, the Science Building, Bartolleto Hall and the Cabot Annex. The complex was completed in 1997 and replaced a previous set of 1940s- and 1950s-era facilities. The Engineering, Math and Science Complex also contains the university's Information Technology Services office.

Kreitzberg Library
Kreitzberg Library is named in recognition of Barbara and Chairman of the Board of Trustees Fred Kreitzberg (NU 1957).  The library has a catalog of more than 240,000 books, about 45,000 electronic journals, and a collection of federal government publications. The Norwich University Archives and Special Collections has rare books and unique source materials relating to military history, the history of Vermont, and the history of the university. The  library was designed by Perry Dean Rogers Architects. It was completed in 1993 at a cost of $8.1 million. In 2015, a renovation project brought the library into the twenty-first century with enhancements including new workstations, group-study and collaborative-learning areas, new technology-enabled classrooms, and a café. Additional improvements include two new conference rooms, a 77 percent increase in the number of seats, and an increase in data speeds.

Webb Hall
Webb Hall was completed in 1960 and originally housed the English, Modern Languages, Social Sciences, Business Administration and the Psychology and Education departments. Dole Auditorium, which seated over four hundred people, was located in Webb Hall. The building is named after J. Watson Webb, a Norwich trustee. The auditorium honored Charles Dole (NU 1869), who served in his career at the university as an instructor in mathematics and Latin, a professor of history and rhetoric, the commandant of cadets and acting president of the university from 1895 to 1896. In 2017, Webb Hall underwent a major renovation that included the dismantling of Dole Auditorium. Following the commencement of the spring semester in 2019, Norwich University completed renovations on Webb Hall, which was briefly renamed North Hall. In 2020, North Hall became Schneider Hall, in honor of retiring Norwich University President Richard W. Schneider.

Cadet barracks
 Hawkins Hall – Named for General Rush Hawkins, a colonel in the Civil War, and philanthropist. Built in 1940 and renovated in 1994 and again in 2008
 Dodge Hall – Named for Major General Grenville M. Dodge, a leader in the construction of the First transcontinental railroad and US Congressman. Originally named Cabot Hall, it was built in 1937 and renovated in 1998 and again in 2013
 Patterson Hall – Named for a 1909 graduate in civil engineering and a trustee. Built in 1958. Renovated in 2017.
 Goodyear Hall – Named for Major General A. Conger Goodyear, a trustee and founder of the Museum of Modern Art. Built in 1955 and renovated in 1999 and again in 2015
 Wilson Hall – Named for Governor of Vermont, Stanley Calef Wilson. Renovated in 2011
 Alumni Hall – First housing-only hall at the Northfield campus, named for the significant alumnus contributions that allowed for its construction. Built in 1905 and renovated in 2005
 Ransom Hall – Named after Colonel Truman B. Ransom, the second president of the university, who was killed leading the assault on Chapultepec during the Mexican–American War. Built in 1957
 Gerard Hall – Named after industrialist and philanthropist Jacques A. Gerard, who became a trustee in 1959. Built in 1962, and renovated in 2010
 Crawford Hall – Named after David C. Crawford (1952) and after whom the School of Engineering is also named, it is the first residence hall to not be on the Upper Parade Ground and was typically reserved for traditional students. As of 2012, it housed both upperclassmen in the Corps of Cadets and civilians. Since the opening of South Hall, it solely houses cadets. Built in 1988.

Residence halls
 South Hall – It is the second dorm to be located off of the Upper Parade Ground and is reserved for traditional students. Built in 2009, it opened for the 2009–10 school year.
 Dalrymple Hall – The newest residence hall, completed in 2014 at a cost of $23.2 million. Tuition will rise 3% as a result of this new building.

Athletic buildings
Andrews Hall

Andrews Hall, built in 1980, houses the Department of Athletics. In addition, it has basketball and racquetball courts and the equipment and athletic training rooms for the university's varsity and intramural teams. The Athletic Hall of Fame is also located in Andrews Hall. The facility honors trustee Paul R. Andrews (NU 1930).

Kreitzberg Arena
Kreitzberg Arena is home to the men’s and women’s varsity ice hockey teams, as well as the school’s club team.

Plumley Armory
The armory, built in 1928, is named to honor a notable 1896 graduate of the university, Charles A. Plumley. Plumley served as the president of the university from 1930 to 1934 when he was elected to Congress as Vermont's sole representative from 1934 to 1951. The main floor of the building provides seating space for 4,000 in an area as large as three basketball courts. There is an elevated running track as well as locker rooms, training rooms, and Navy ROTC offices in the basement. Connected to the armory is Goodyear Pool. Built in 1962, the pool is a 25 x 14 yard 6 lane facility that is open to all university members.

Sabine Field 
Dedicated in 1921, Sabine Field was originally a venue for football, baseball, track, and outdoor ice hockey. Over time, as hockey moved indoors and baseball found its own home at Garrity Field, Sabine continued to serve the university football and cross country teams. Then in 2013, a renovation transformed Sabine Field into a multi-sport, multi-activity, lit stadium that can be used in most weather conditions. The improvements included synthetic turf field that meets NCAA regulations for football, soccer, and lacrosse, a 400-meter resilient urethane running track with 42-inch lanes, energy-efficient stadium lights, a new sound system, bleachers, and press box, and other upgrades. On October 4, 2013, Sabine Field was officially renamed to Sabine Field at Haynes Family Stadium. Sabine Field was dedicated in 1921 in honor of the memory of 1868 graduate Dr. George K. Sabine’s son, George K. Sabine Jr., who died shortly after returning from overseas.

Shapiro Field House
Shapiro Field House, built in 1987 and named for trustee Jacob Shapiro (NU 1936), houses a multipurpose arena that has a 200-meter indoor running track, four tennis courts, and a climbing wall. It is also used for morning PT (Physical Training), athletic practices, Commencement, concerts and other university functions.

Other buildings
The Harmon Memorial
The Harmon Memorial is a tribute to Major General Ernest Harmon, who attended Norwich University from 1912 to 1913 and was later president from 1950 to 1968. Recorded on the memorial, by year of death, are the names of alumni, faculty, staff, and friends of Norwich University that have made a "significant contribution" to the university.

Harmon Hall & Wise Campus Center
Harmon Hall opened in 1955 and later enlarged in 1958. Since then, it has served as the focal point for student life and activities. The campus mess hall, bookstore, post office, and The Mill (a snack bar open to Corps upperclassmen and civilians) are located on the lower two floors. The Foreign Student Office, Student Activities, Yearbook Office, Music Program offices, a game room, and a lounge were located on the top floor. This floor originally housed the departments of English, History, and Modern Languages until they were moved to Webb Hall in 1960. Harmon Hall was renovated in 2007. The addition onto Harmon Hall is named the Wise Campus Center.

Jackman Hall
Norwich University moved to Northfield from Norwich, Vermont, in 1866 when the South Barracks at the older location were destroyed by fire. Old Jackman Hall was the first building to be constructed at the new central Vermont site. The building was erected in 1868, and named Jackman Hall in 1907 to honor Brigadier General Alonzo Jackman (NU 1836) a faculty member, proponent of the Transatlantic telegraph cable and militia Brigadier General during the American Civil War. From its construction till 1905 the building served as housing for cadets. In the mid-1950s Jackman Hall was extensively remodeled and modernized, however, it became apparent that the almost century-old barracks were too costly to maintain. It was decided that rather than pay for near continual upkeep to build a new hall on the same site. As many newer barracks had been built since its original construction it was decided that the new Jackman Hall would serve as the primary administration building. Currently the Army and Air Force ROTC departments are also housed in Jackman Hall.

White Chapel
Constructed by a gift from Eugene L. White (NU 1914), a trustee, the chapel was completed in 1941. Originally designed as a multi-purpose building, then White Hall has served as a mess hall with a dining room, lunch room, kitchen, a college store and a recreational room. White Hall was converted to the university's first single-purpose chapel after Harmon Hall was opened in 1955. There are two bronze plaques on the walls that honor the Norwich war dead. Weekly services include Catholic Mass on Wednesday and Sunday, non-denominational service on Sunday, and Islamic prayer on Friday.

Sullivan Museum and History Center
One of the newer buildings on the campus, the Sullivan Museum was opened January 22, 2007. The building is named after General Gordon R. Sullivan (ret.), Norwich class of 1959 and former U.S. Army Chief of Staff. The Sullivan Museum houses state-of-the-art conservation, storage, and display facilities for the wide variety of Norwich University artifacts and memorabilia. Items currently displayed cover a wide spectrum of Norwich history, including uniforms worn by Alden Partridge and Alonzo Jackman to pieces from more recent history.

Students and organization

Norwich university has more than 4,000 students, including over 2,500 traditional undergraduate students and more than 1,500 in the university’s online programs, which includes nearly 800 graduate students and over 700 in undergraduate degree-completion programs. As of 2018, Norwich University has 162 full-time faculty and more than 200 part-time faculty. In attendance in 2018 are 81 international students and scholars and exchange students, representing 30 countries.

Concurrent service for cadets in reserve components is permitted. Some students serve with either the Vermont National Guard or the Vermont State Guard 3rd Battalion based out of the Vermont National Guard Armoury in nearby Berlin, Vermont.

Corps of Cadets

Cadet officers and non-commissioned officers command the Corps of Cadets. As leaders, they are responsible for the day-to-day administration, operation, training and discipline of the Corps. Norwich is one of six senior military colleges in the country recognized by Title 10 of the U.S. Code, Section 2111a(f). This entitles eligible ROTC graduates to active duty service if they so choose. Until 2018, the Corps was structured as a regiment commanded by a cadet colonel (C/COL) with five battalions each commanded by a cadet lieutenant colonel (C/LTC) and a Headquarters company commanded by a cadet major. 1st, 2nd, and provisional battalions were composed of companies of upperclassmen commanded by a cadet captain with two or three platoons per company. 3rd and 4th Battalion were freshman training battalions and were composed of three companies of three platoons each. This structure was put in place for the 2009–2010 school year, replacing the more traditional "Original Company" system.

In fall of 2018, the Corps of Cadets was reorganized as a regiment, still commanded by a cadet colonel, having only three battalions (1st, 2nd, and Provisional), commanded each by a C/LTC (Headquarters Company now falls under the command of Provisional Battalion). In addition to having two upperclassmen companies (of three platoons each), both line battalions also contain freshman training companies (consisting of three platoons each). Provisional Battalion now houses Headquarters Company and one freshman training company (containing three platoons) which feeds into its original three specialty units (Band Company, Drill Company, and the Cavalry Troop).

This change creates a “sister company” partnership with upper-class companies and the Rook training companies (CTC 1 partnered with A Co etc.). This “sister company” construct creates a partnership between a Rook Training Company and an upper-class company. For instance, if a Rook is in CTC 1 his first year, he will matriculate to A Co. his second and subsequent years. A Co.supports CTC 1 in training and has a vested interest in CTC 1’s success because the Rooks in that Company will be members of A Co. the following year. Freshmen in CTC 5 who do not complete the specialty unit training required to be in Band Co, Drill Co, or the Cavalry troop will be assigned to a unit in a line battalion at the start of their second year in the corps.

Norwich University Corps of Cadets rank insignia follows West Point with the use of chevrons to show all cadet ranks in lieu of chevrons, disks, or lozenges. Any recognized cadet defaults to the rank of private if they hold no job responsibilities in the Corps of Cadets.

Special units

The college has several special units that are supervised by federal ROTC units. The Army Reserve Officers' Training Corps (AROTC) detachment contains the Norwich Artillery Battery, the Norwich Ranger Company, the Ranger Challenge team, and the Mountain Cold Weather Company. The NROTC detachment sponsors a chapter of the Semper Fidelis Society and Golden Anchor Society.

Academics
Norwich has 29 majors across six academic divisions with the most popular major being criminal justice.

Graduate program
The College of Graduate and Continuing Studies oversees the university's online graduate programs as well as six online bachelor's degree completion programs. The majority of the graduate programs are conducted on a distance learning platform, including a combined 5-year Master of Architecture program and a National Security Agency-sponsored Centers of Academic Excellence in Information Assurance Education.

Rankings
Norwich was ranked by U.S. News & World Report in 2014 at 74th in the Regional Universities (North) category.

Athletics
Norwich offers 20 varsity sports, including baseball, men's and women's basketball, men's and women's cross country, football, men's and women's ice hockey, men's and women's lacrosse, men's and women's rugby, men's and women's soccer, men's and women's swimming and diving, softball, men's tennis, wrestling, and women's volleyball. Golf was reinstated as a varsity sport for fall 2022. The Cadets compete at the NCAA Division III level and are affiliated in four conferences, mainly the Great Northeast Athletic Conference (GNAC) and the Eastern Collegiate Athletic Conference. The football team joined the New England Women's and Men's Athletic Conference in 2017. The college also has a number of student clubs for sports such as paintball, fencing, horseback riding etc.

Football
The Cadets first fielded a football team in 1893. Among early notable moments is a 28–6 loss to Boston College at Fenway Park in 1914, the first college football game ever played at that venue. Overall, the program has appeared in seven ECAC bowl games (1984, 2003, 2004, 2010, 2012, 2013, 2014) and two NCAA tournaments (2011, 2015). Norwich has produced 16 All-Americans, and has won or shared four Eastern Collegiate Football Conference (ECFC) Championships (2009, 2011, 2013–shared with Gallaudet University, 2015). Six former Cadets have reached an NFL camp.

Norwich was a member of the ECFC from 2009 to 2016, and departed the league with a 46–10 record in conference games. In 2017, Norwich joined the NEWMAC as an affiliate member for football.

The Cadets' home field is Sabine Field at Haynes Family Stadium. The field underwent a massive renovation for the 2013 season, transitioning from grass to turf, and adding lights for night contests. Campus folklore includes a tale of a ghost of an old cavalry cadet who guards the gate to the stadium.

The best coach to ever coach here is E. Dewey Graham

Rivalries 

Norwich's most prominent football rivals include Middlebury College, Castleton University, and the United States Coast Guard Academy. Norwich also plays long-time opponent St. Lawrence University for an annual trophy. The series with Middlebury concluded after the 1991 season, after 99 contests, with the NESCAC's decision to eliminate non-conference football competition. Castleton founded their football program in 2009, and the Norwich game quickly became an intense rivalry. The Norwich/Coast Guard series (the Little Army/Navy Game) had been dormant after the 2005 game, but resumed again in 2017.

All these rivalry games involve a traveling trophy awarded to the winner:
 Norwich vs. Middlebury: The Wadsworth Trophy
 Norwich vs. Coast Guard: The Mug
 Norwich vs. Castleton: The Maple Sap Bucket
 Norwich vs. St. Lawrence: The Hoffman Cup

Rugby
Women's rugby has existed at Norwich since 1985 and gained a varsity status in 2008. They won the inaugural USA Rugby Collegiate Division II National Championship in the spring of 2012 and a USA Rugby Collegiate Division 1 National Sevens Title in the fall of 2011.

Ice hockey
Men's ice hockey began play in 1909 and has become a national powerhouse. The program has won regular season conference championships in 20 of the last 22 seasons. The Cadets have won four NCAA Division III Men's Ice Hockey Championship titles (2000, 2003, 2010, and 2017). The program has reached the NCAA Division III Frozen Four 13 times. Dozens of players have gone on to professional careers, and three alumni have reached the NHL (Frank Simonetti, Keith Aucoin, Kurtis McLean).

In 2007–08 Norwich women's ice hockey was elevated to varsity status. A year later, the Cadets won their first-ever ECAC East conference championship and advanced to the NCAA Division III Women's Ice Hockey tournament. They have won 8 conference championships, and have reached 7 final fours. Norwich won the program's first NCAA Division III title in 2011, and won again in 2018.

Other Sports

Women's lacrosse program gained varsity status in 2008. They won 3 consecutive Great Northeast Athletic Conference Titles (2010, 2011, 2012), advancing to the NCAA Division III Tournament each time.

Rifle team won the national intercollegiate rifle championship in 1916 and 1920. It is no longer a sport at the school.

National Champions

Rifle (2):
1916, 1920

Women's Rugby (6):
2011 Division I Sevens (USA Rugby), 2012 Division II 15s (USA Rugby), 2012 Division I Sevens (USA Rugby), 2013 Division I Sevens (USA Rugby), 2013 Division I 15s (ACRA),  2014 Division I Sevens (ACRA)

Men's Hockey (4):
2000, 2003, 2010, 2017

Women's Hockey (2):
2011, 2018

Drill Team: 2009

Notable alumni

Military

138 graduates of Norwich University have served as general officers in the U.S. armed forces: 102 Army generals, 12 Air Force generals, 9 Marine Corps generals, and 16 Navy admirals. 26 graduates served as generals in foreign armies: 9 Royal Thai Army generals, 1 Royal Thai Air Force general, and 16 Republic of China Army generals.

Among the notable military graduates and former students of Norwich are:

 Major General Fred Thaddeus Austin (1888), U.S. Army Chief of Field Artillery from 1927 to 1930
 Brigadier General Hiram Iddings Bearss (attended 1894–1895) – Received the Medal of Honor for heroism during the Philippine–American War
 Major General Francis William Billado (1933) – Adjutant General of the Vermont National Guard from 1955 to 1966.
 Lieutenant General Edward H. Brooks (1916) – Commander, VI Armored Corps, 1944–1945, during World War II; commanding general, U.S. Army in the Caribbean, 1947; commanding general, Second Army, 1951.
 Captain James Montross Burt (1939) – Received the Medal of Honor for his actions during a 10-day period in October 1944 as the 2nd Armored Division fought to capture Aachen, Germany in the Battle of Aachen during World War II.
 Master Chief Petty Officer Edward C. Byers, Jr. (2016) – Navy SEAL, Medal of Honor recipient
 Captain George Musalas Colvocoresses (1831) – Adopted son of Captain Alden Partridge; Commanded USS Saratoga during the American Civil War.
 Rear Admiral George Partridge Colvocoresses (1866) – Commandant of Cadets at the United States Naval Academy at Annapolis from 1905 to 1909.
 Rear Admiral George A. Converse (1863) – Notable naval engineer; Chief of the Bureaus of Equipment, Ordnance, and Navigation.
 Major General Reginald M. Cram (1936) – Adjutant General of the Vermont National Guard in 1966, and from 1967 to 1981
 Admiral of the Navy George Dewey (attended 1852–1854) – Commanded the Navy's Asiatic Squadron at the Battle of Manila Bay during the Spanish–American War.
 Major General Grenville M. Dodge (1851) – Commander, Department of the Missouri; Chief Engineer of Union Pacific during construction of the Transcontinental Railroad. Dodge City, Kansas is named in his honor.
 Major General Donald E. Edwards (1959) – Adjutant General of the Vermont National Guard from 1981 to 1997.
 Major General Ernest N. Harmon (attended 1914) – Commander, 1st Armored Division, 2nd Armored Division, and XXII Corps during World War II; commander, VI Corps. Twenty-second President of the university, 1950.
 Drummer Willie Johnston (attended, 1866–1868) – youngest recipient of the Medal of Honor
 Brigadier General Frederick W. Lander (1852) – Surveyor of railroad routes and wagon trails in the Far West; commanded a division in the Army of the Potomac during the American Civil War.
 Albert Martin – defender of the Alamo in 1836
 Brigadier General Robert F. McDermott (attended 1937–1939) – Flew 61 combat missions during World War II in the European Theatre. In 1956 he was appointed Dean of Faculty to the Air Force Academy. In 1959 President Eisenhower appointed him the first Permanent Dean of Faculty and promoted him to Brigadier General.
 Brigadier General Robert H. Milroy (1843) – In command or present at the Union reverses of the Battle of McDowell, Battle of Cross Keys, and Battle of Second Winchester.
 Major General Lewis Samuel Partridge (1838) – Nephew of Alden Partridge, Adjutant General of the Vermont Militia from 1852 to 1854.
 Rear Admiral Hiram Paulding (class of 1822) – Commander of the Navy's Home Squadron, 1856–1858; Commandant of the New York Navy Yard
 Sergeant Major Thomas Payne (Class of 2017) - Member of U.S. Army Special Mission Unit who received the Medal of Honor for operations against ISIS in Iraq in 2012.
 1st Lieutenant James Ezekiel Porter (attended 1863–1864) – Officer in the 7th Cavalry from 1869 to 1876; killed at the Battle of the Little Bighorn.
 Lieutenant General David E. Quantock (1980) – Inspector General of the United States Army.
 Brigadier General Thomas E. G. Ransom (attended 1848–1850) – general in the Union Army during the American Civil War. At various times, he commanded divisions of XIII, XVI and XVII Corps.
 Brigadier General Edmund Rice (1859) – Received the Medal of Honor for actions at the Battle of Gettysburg.
 Major General William Huntington Russell (1828) – Commander of Connecticut state militia during the American Civil War; founder of the Skull and Bones society at Yale University.
 Colonel Thomas O. Seaver (1859) – Commanded the 3rd Vermont Infantry during the American Civil War; received the Medal of Honor for his heroism at Spotsylvania.
 General Gordon R. Sullivan (1959) – Army Chief of Staff, 1991–1995.
 Commander James H. Ward (1823) – First Commandant of the United States Naval Academy; first Union Naval officer killed in action during the American Civil War.
 Gideon Welles (1826) – Served as United States Secretary of the Navy under Presidents Lincoln and Johnson from 1861 to 1869.
 Major General Seth Williams (1903) – Quartermaster General of the Marine Corps 1937–1944.
 Brigadier General Edward Bancroft Williston (1856) – Received the Medal of Honor for heroism at Trevilian Station during the Civil War.
 Major General Leonard F. Wing Sr. (attended 1910–1914) – Commander, 43rd Infantry Division during World War II.
 Brigadier General Henry Clay Wood (1856) – Received the Medal of Honor for Distinguished Gallantry at the Battle of Wilson’s Creek, Missouri, on August 10, 1861.
 Major General Horatio G. Wright (attended 1834–1836) – Commander of the VI Corps of the Army of the Potomac during the American Civil War; Chief of Engineers for the Army; Chief Engineer for the completion of the Washington Monument.

Political

 Charles J. Adams 1939 – Vermont Attorney General
 F. Elliott Barber, Jr. 1934 – Vermont Attorney General
 Alvan E. Bovay 1841 – Co-founder of Republican Party and of Ripon College
 Thomas Bragg 1828 – Governor of North Carolina from 1855 to 1859, US Senator from North Carolina 1859 to 1861 and 2nd Attorney General of the Confederate States.
 Ansel Briggs 1820 – First Governor of Iowa
 Francis K. Brooks 1967 – Majority Leader of the Vermont House of Representatives and member of the Vermont Senate
 George E. Bryant 1854 – member of the Wisconsin State Senate
 Thomas Green Clemson 1824 – US Ambassador to Belgium and founder of Clemson University
 George W. Clinton 1827 – Mayor of Buffalo, son of DeWitt Clinton.
 John P. Connarn 1941 – Vermont House of Representatives, 1957–1965; Vermont Attorney General, 1965–1967; Judge, Vermont District Court, 1967–1985
 Tarak Nath Das, 1908 – Indian freedom fighter, co-founder of the Ghadar Party, expelled for his anti-British political activities
 Charles D. Drake 1825 – United States Senator from Missouri.
 Ryland Fletcher 1824 – Governor of Vermont.
 Colonel Ernest Willard Gibson 1894 – U.S. Senator from Vermont.
 Colonel Ernest W. Gibson, Jr. 1923 – U.S. Senator from 1940 to 1941. Later the Governor of Vermont from 1946 to 1950.
 Jason R. Holsman 2003 – State Senator for the 7th District of Missouri.
 William Pitt Kellogg 1848 – Chief Justice of the Nebraska Territory (1861) Elected to the Senate from Louisiana in 1868; Governor of Louisiana in 1873; and left office with the end of Reconstruction 1877. Returning to the Senate in 1877–1895. One of the few carpetbagger politicians to remain in power in the South post-Reconstruction.
 Colin Kenny 1966 – Adviser to Prime Minister Pierre Trudeau from 1970 to 1979, appointed to the Senate of Canada by Trudeau in 1984 for the province of Ontario.
 Jefferson P. Kidder 1834 – 17th Lieutenant Governor of Vermont, United States Congressman for the Dakota Territory, and a justice of territorial Supreme Court.
 William Little Lee 1842 – Lawyer and privy counselor to Kamehameha III of Hawaii, later served as the Kingdom's chief justice from 1848 to his death in 1857.
 Caleb Lyon 1841 – Governor of the Idaho Territory from 1864 to 1865 and Member of the 33rd United States Congress from 1853 to 1855.
 Horatio Seymour 1828 – Governor of New York, 1868 Democratic nominee for President of the United States.
 Charles A. Plumley 1896 – Served in United States Congress from January 16, 1934, to January 3, 1951, as U.S. Representative from Vermont.
 Paul N. Poirier 1970 – Majority Leader of the Vermont House of Representatives.
 Edward Stanly 1829 – Whig politician and orator who served the State of North Carolina in the Congress from 1837 to 1843 and again from 1847 to 1853.
 Burleigh F. Spalding 1877 – Served as a United States representative from North Dakota from 1899 to 1901 and again from 1903 to 1905. Chief Justice of the North Dakota Supreme Court from 1908 to 1915.
 Gideon Welles 1826 – Secretary of the Navy from 1861 to 1869

Business
 Harry Bates Thayer – President from 1919 to 1925 and chairman of the board of AT&T until 1928
 Fadel Lawandy, Director of the Hoag Center for Real Estate and Finance, Director of the Janes Financial Center and Clinical Associate Professor of Real Estate and Finance at Chapman University.

Law
 Theodore Sedgwick 1826 – United States Attorney for the Southern District of New York.

Engineering and architecture
 Major General Grenville Dodge 1850 – Civil War General, US Congressman and later Chief Engineer of the Union Pacific Railroad. Dodge City, KS is named in his honor.
 Edward Dean Adams - 1864 - Developed the systems to produce electric power at Niagara Falls. He organized and directed the Cataract Construction Company in 1890, the first to utilize the water power of Niagara Falls for the production of industrial electric power, one of the great engineering feats of the 19th century,
 Samuel T. Wellman 1866 – American steel industry pioneer, industrialist, and prolific inventor. Wellman was also president of the American Society of Mechanical Engineers from 1901 to 1902.
 William Rutherford Mead – Joined with Charles Follen McKim and Stanford White to form McKim, Mead, and White in 1879. Associated with the City Beautiful and Beaux Arts movements, McKim, Mead, and White designed the Rhode Island State House, the Morningside Heights campus of Columbia University, the New York Pennsylvania Station and the West Wing of the White House.
 Richard E. Hayden 1968 – acoustics researcher, won the Wright Brothers Medal in 1973 for a research paper on noise reduction for STOL aircraft

Athletes
 Arlie Pond 1888–1890 – Major league pitcher for the Baltimore Orioles from 1895 to 1898
 Frank Liebel 1941 – Professional football player 1942–1948 with the New York Giants and Chicago Bears.
 Allen Doyle 1971 – Golfer on the Champions Tour. 2005 & 2006 US Senior Open Champion. 1999 Senior PGA Champion.
 Frank Simonetti 1984 – Professional American ice hockey player with the Boston Bruins from 1984 to 1988.
Pierre Garçon, professional football player
 Mike Thomas Brown 2000 – Academic All-American wrestler; Professional Mixed Martial Artist, former WEC Featherweight Champion with his victory over Urijah Faber in November 2008
 Keith Aucoin 2001 – Professional American ice hockey player.
 Kurtis McLean 2005 – Professional Canadian ice hockey player
 Amanda Conway 2020 – professional ice hockey player with the Connecticut Whale

Other notable alumni
 Roxane Gay — writer and professor
 Frederick Townsend Ward 1853 (non-graduate) – American soldier of fortune famous for his military victories for Imperial China during the Taiping Rebellion.
 Lieutenant Colonel Michael Mori 1991 – Marine Corps officer and lawyer of Guantanamo Bay detainee David Matthew Hicks, aka Abu Muslim Austraili. Received the American Civil Liberties Union's Roger N. Baldwin Medal of Liberty Award in 2005.
 Major Richard W. Higgins- USAF pilot serving in Germany decorated by the Luftwaffe for saving civilians in an accident.
 Bill W 1917 – co-founder of Alcoholics Anonymous. Was recognized by Time Magazine as being in the top 20 persons of the Time 100: Heroes and Icons in the 20th century.
 Marjorie Welish – Poet, author, artist and art critic.

Notable Faculty and Administrators

University presidents
The presidents of Norwich University include:
 Alden Partridge, 1819–1843
 Truman B. Ransom (Class of 1825), 1844–1847
 James Butler, 1847–1848
 Henry Wheaton (Class of 1841), 1848–1849
 Edward Bourns, 1850–1865
 Samuel Shattuck (Class of 1860), Acting President 1866–1867
 Thomas Walker, 1867–1868
 Roger Howard, 1869–1871
 Malcolm Douglass, 1871–1875
 Charles Curtis (Class of 1837), 1875
 Josiah Swett (Class of 1837), 1875–1877
 Charles Curtis (Class of 1861), 1877–1880
 Charles Lewis (Class of 1855), 1880–1892
 George Nichols, Acting President 1892–1893
 Charles Dole (Class of 1869), Acting President 1894–1895
 Allan Brown, 1896–1904
 Charles Spooner (Class of 1878), 1904–1915
 Ira Reeves, 1915–1917
 Herbert Roberts, Acting President 1917–1920
 Charles Albert Plumley (Class of 1896), 1920–1934
 Porter Adams, 1934–1939
 John Thomas, 1939–1944
 Homer Dodge, 1944–1950
 Ernest N. Harmon (Class of 1916), 1950–1965
 Barksdale Hamlett, 1965–1972
 Loring Hart, 1972–1982
 W. Russell Todd (Class of 1950), 1982–1992:
 Richard Schneider, 1992–2020
 Mark Anarumo, 2020–present

Faculty and administrators
 Paul A. Chase, professor of military science (1944–1946), Associate Justice of the Vermont Supreme Court
 Jay H. Gordon, Professor of Accounting
 Alonzo Jackman, professor and librarian.
 Leon Kromer, commandant of cadets from 1941 to 1943
 Steven E. Sodergren, Professor of History and Chairman of the Department of History and Political Science
 Frank Tompkins, Professor of Military Science and tactics 1910, commandant of cadets 1910–1913, 1916–1917, 1919, 1923
 Mitchell Yockelson, Professor of Military History

References

External links

 Official website
 

 
1819 establishments in Vermont
Buildings and structures in Northfield, Vermont
Education in Washington County, Vermont
Educational institutions established in 1819
New England Hockey Conference teams
Tourist attractions in Washington County, Vermont
United States senior military colleges
Private universities and colleges in Vermont